The 2000 Lafayette Leopards football team was an American football team that represented Lafayette College during the 2000 NCAA Division I-AA football season. The Leopards tied for last in the Patriot League. 

In their first year under head coach Frank Tavani, the Leopards compiled a 2–9 record. Mike Levy and Phil Yarberough were the team captains.

The Leopards were outscored 350 to 244. Their 1–5 conference record tied for worst in the seven-team Patriot League standings. 

Lafayette played its home games at Fisher Field on College Hill in Easton, Pennsylvania.

Schedule

References

Lafayette
Lafayette Leopards football seasons
Lafayette Leopards football